Take Out Yo Gun is the second album by kwaito star The Dogg, released in December 2004. The album has received many positive reviews from critics despite the fact that it was released the same year as Shimaliw' Osatana. Take Out Yo Gun was the first album to be released on The Dogg's own label Mshasho Productions. Gazza appeared on the album, The Dogg also appeared on Gazza's Zula II Survive which marked the end of their collaboration.

The album's first single The Dogg Is Back became an anthem and topped the charts on various radio stations in the country.  The album was very successful and won awards both at the Sanlam-NBC Music Awards and at the Namibian Music Awards. Take Out Yo Gun won Dogg his third artist of the year award at the Sanlam-NBC Music Awards which sent him on the France trip that was sponsored by the FNCC.

Production 

The entire album was produced by Elvo, and co-produced by The Dogg, except for track 1 which was produced by former Mshasho artist and producer, Carl.

Track listing 

2004 albums
The Dogg albums
Albums produced by the Dogg
Albums produced by Elvo
Mshasho Productions albums